Events from the year 1881 in Denmark.

Incumbents
 Monarch – Christian IX
 Prime minister – J. B. S. Estrup

Events

Births
 6 July – Nancy Dalberg, composer (died 1949)
 11 September – Asta Nielsen, actress (died 1972)

Deaths
 9 March – Caroline Amalie of Augustenburg, Queen of Denmark (born 1796)
 31 March – Princess Caroline of Denmark (born 1793)
 21 June – Emil Normann, painter (born 1798)
 20 September  – Martin Hammerich, literary historian and educator (Born 1811)
 24 September – Petrine Fredstrup, ballet dancer (born 1827)

References

 
1880s in Denmark
Denmark
Years of the 19th century in Denmark